Washington County is a county in Texas. As of the 2020 census, the population was 35,805. Its county seat is Brenham, which is located along U.S. Highway 290, 72 miles northwest of Houston. The county was created in 1835 as a municipality of Mexico and organized as a county in 1837. It is named for George Washington, the first president of the United States.

Washington County comprises the Brenham, TX Micropolitan Statistical Area, which is also included in the Houston-The Woodlands, TX Combined Statistical Area.

Washington-on-the-Brazos in the county is notable as the site of the signing of the Texas Declaration of Independence during the Convention of 1836. Reflecting the county's history as a destination of mid-19th-century German immigrants who came after the 1848 German revolutions, in the 2000 US Census, more than one third of residents identified as being of German ancestry.

Geography

Major highways
  U.S. Highway 290
  State Highway 36
  State Highway 105

Adjacent counties
 Brazos County (north)
 Grimes County (northeast)
 Waller County (east)
 Austin County (south)
 Fayette County (southwest)
 Lee County (west)
 Burleson County (northwest)

Demographics

Note: the US Census treats Hispanic/Latino as an ethnic category. This table excludes Latinos from the racial categories and assigns them to a separate category. Hispanics/Latinos can be of any race.

As of the census of 2000, there were 30,373 people, 11,322 households, and 7,936 families residing in the county.  The population density was 50 people per square mile (19/km2).  There were 13,241 housing units at an average density of 22 per square mile (8/km2).  The racial makeup of the county was 74.68% White, 18.66% Black or African American, 0.27% Native American, 1.21% Asian, 4.02% from other races, and 1.16% from two or more races.  8.71% of the population identified as Hispanic or Latino of any race. 33.6% identified as of German, 6.1% American, 5.7% English, 5.3% Irish and 5.0% Polish ancestry according to Census 2000. 88.1% spoke English, 8.6% Spanish, and 1.2% German as their first language.

There were 11,322 households, out of which 31.60% had children under the age of 18 living with them, 54.80% were married couples living together, 11.40% had a female householder with no husband present, and 29.90% were non-families. 25.70% of all households were made up of individuals, and 12.90% had someone living alone who was 65 years of age or older.  The average household size was 2.53 and the average family size was 3.05.

In the county, the population was spread out, with 24.70% under the age of 18, 11.10% from 18 to 24, 25.30% from 25 to 44, 22.10% from 45 to 64, and 16.90% who were 65 years of age or older.  The median age was 37 years. For every 100 females there were 94.70 males.  For every 100 females age 18 and over, there were 92.10 males.

The median income for a household in the county was $36,760, and the median income for a family was $43,982. Males had a median income of $31,698 versus $21,346 for females. The per capita income for the county was $17,384.  About 9.80% of families and 12.90% of the population were below the poverty line, including 14.80% of those under age 18 and 14.50% of those age 65 or over.

Communities

Cities
 Brenham (county seat)
 Burton

Unincorporated communities

 Berlin
 Chappell Hill
 Greenvine
 Independence
 Latium
 Phillipsburg
 Prairie Hill
 Quarry
 Rehburg
 Salem
 Washington-on-the-Brazos
 William Penn

Historic communities
As part of a San Jacinto Day speech in 1900, Hon. Harry Haynes said, "this grand old county, the birthplace and cradle of Texas liberty, is in a sense a vast town cemetery. Tiger Point, Union Hill, Long Point, Sandtown, Old Gay Hill, Mt. Vernon, Turkey Creek, Mt. Gilead, Rock Island, Jacksonville, Mustang, all by the inexorable decrees of new conditions and changes wrought in the course of human events have been blotted from the face of this beautiful earth."

 Ayres
 Cedar Creeka mile north of Chappell Hill
 Coles Settlement
 Gay Hill
 Goodwill
 Graball
 Mt. Vernon2nd county seat, 1841-1843
 Muellersville
 Rock Island
 Tigertown
 Winklemannsingle owner tourist town
 Yegua
 Zionville

Politics
Since the 1940s, Washington County has been powerfully Republican, with the only Democratic presidential candidate to carry it since Franklin D. Roosevelt’s 1936 landslide being Hill Country native Lyndon B. Johnson in 1964. Since 1980 no Democrat has gained more than 40 percent of the county’s vote

The GOP was competitive in the county during the Third Party System and to a smaller extent during the “System of 1896” era as the county then had a sizeable freedman population, but the county became typically “Solid South” Democratic for a brief period once that freedman population was completely disfranchised. Following the New Deal, the almost entirely white electorate of Washington County – which was being gradually stripped of its freedman population by the Great Migration – was one of the first to turn against FDR, voting for Wendell Willkie in 1940 at a time when most Majority black counties would vote over ninety percent for Democrats due to Reconstruction memories. Washington was one of eleven Texas counties to vote in 1920 for American Party candidate James E. Ferguson, and the solitary county to give a majority to the conservative “Texas Regulars”, which were a predecessor to the numerous “Dixiecrat” movements of the following two decades, in the 1944 election.

Education
School districts:
 Brenham Independent School District
 Burton Independent School District
 Giddings Independent School District
 Hallettsville Independent School District

Blinn College is the designated community college for all of the county.

See also

 National Register of Historic Places listings in Washington County, Texas
 Recorded Texas Historic Landmarks in Washington County

References

External links
 Washington County government's website
 
 Record Book of Conditional Land Grants for Washington County, 1841, hosted by the Portal to Texas History

 
1837 establishments in the Republic of Texas
Populated places established in 1837